American Standard is the second studio album by American post-grunge band Seven Mary Three. It was released on September 5, 1995, on Mammoth Records. The album would be Seven Mary Three's breakthrough success, rising to number 24 on the Billboard 200 and was certified platinum in the United States and Canada. Many of the songs were rerecorded versions of tracks off Seven Mary Three's independent debut, Churn.

Overview 
The album's biggest hit single was "Cumbersome" (#1 on Billboard'''s Hot Mainstream Rock Tracks, #7 on Hot Modern Rock Tracks, and #39 on the Billboard Hot 100).  Other Billboard-charting singles were "Water's Edge" (#7 on Hot Mainstream Rock Tracks and #37 on Hot Modern Rock Tracks), and "My My" (#19 on Hot Mainstream Rock Tracks).

Vinyl release
On April 13, 2019, in conjunction with Record Store Day, American Standard was released on vinyl record for the first time. Wardog Records produced a limited edition of 800 black vinyl copies and 200 yellow vinyl copies.

 Track listing 

 Personnel 
Adapted from the liner notes of American Standard''.

Seven Mary Three
 Jason Ross – lead vocals, rhythm guitar
 Jason Pollock – lead guitar, backing vocals
 Casey Daniel – bass
 Giti Khalsa – drums

Production
 Producers: Jason Ross, Jason Pollock, and Tom Morris
 Engineering: Tom Morris and Brian Benscoter
 Mixing: Tom Morris
 Mastering: Tom Morris
 Art Direction: Lane Wurster and Seven Mary Three
 Graphic Design: Chris Eselgroth
 Photography: Ben Gray
 Additional Photography: Alex Tremi
 Cover Photograph: Suzanne Opton/Swanstock

Charts

Weekly charts

Year-end charts

Certifications

|-

References 

1995 albums
Seven Mary Three albums
Mammoth Records albums
Albums recorded at Morrisound Recording